Csurgó is a district in south-western part of Somogy County, Hungary. Csurgó is also the name of the town where the district seat is found. The district is located in the Southern Transdanubia Statistical Region.

Geography 
Csurgó District borders with Nagykanizsa District (Zala County) to the north, Marcali District and Nagyatád District to the east, Barcs District to the southeast, the Croatian county of Koprivnica-Križevci to the southwest. The number of the inhabited places in Csurgó District is 18.

Municipalities 
The district has 1 town, 1 large village and 16 villages.
(ordered by population, as of 1 January 2013)

The bolded municipality is city, italics municipality is large village.

See also
List of cities and towns in Hungary

References

External links
 Postal codes of the Csurgó District

Districts in Somogy County